Legends Magazine is a literary and music magazine founded by writer Marcus Pan in October, 1990.  It covers themes of dark horror, fantasy and science fiction and surrealism in its literary scope and reviews and discusses music in the gothic, punk, heavy metal, electronica and similar darker genres.  It also includes book reviews, DVD reviews and issues related to the goth and punk subcultures.  The magazine has released over 150 issues and ran for 15 years, with the full text of all articles available at their online website in full.  Legends tries to stick to a monthly publishing schedule as much as it can.

History
Legends magazine began in October, 1990 under the direction of Marcus Pan who continues as editor-in-chief.  Originally started as a self-serving fanzine that covered science fiction, fantasy and gaming, it was intended to be a short lived project of three issues in length.  It nonetheless continued and evolved, adding more work from other writers and artists as time drew on.

Around 1996 the Legends Online site was born on the World Wide Web and eventually the text of all articles and scans of all imaging was available online.  The magazine added such notable writers as Dan Century, Cameron Rodgers, Logan Russell and Sue Simpson to its staff who later went on to writing careers of their own.  The musical aspect started to find its way into more mainstream sections of Legends a couple years after the website version went up.

At this time Legends struggled to embody a music magazine format while not losing its literary side, an act that may be a failure or a success depending on whom you ask.  The music aspect continued to grow as interviews with such artists as Alien Sex Fiend, Distorted Reality, Nashville Pussy and Dave Smalley, to name only a few, brought more widespread readers to the magazine.  Literature and fiction is still embodied in the magazine, though months can go by before a fictional feature comes up, but music has taken hold as a major aspect of the magazine's continuing format.

In addition to these main ideas, Legends also features the 'Off the Shelf' book review column, DVD and movie reviews, 'Horrorscopes' by Auntie PanPan and, until recently, political columnist and satirist the Mean Little Man.  The professionalism of the magazine itself began to change in mid-2003 when editor Marcus Pan partnered with Mean Little Man productions.

Mean Little Man Productions
In mid-2003 Legends Magazine's editor Marcus Pan partnered with Mean Little Man Productions in an attempt to further Legends Magazine's reach and potential.  Marcus would continue to handle the creative and writing direction of the magazine while MLM would further the marketing and promotions of same.  As time wore on for a couple years it became apparent that the two parties were incompatible when it came to working together on a business scale, with MLM arguing that the direction of the magazine wasn't being taken seriously enough while Marcus argued that the direction of the magazine was fine and fulfills the goals that he had in mind since inception - promoting music, writing himself and providing a forum for new fiction writers and essayists.  The partnership was almost immediately dissolved following the 150th issue party.

The partnership however began a new era for Legends Magazine as the work done by MLM provided new features to the periodical.  The website was redesigned and is still in use today and the hardcopy edition of the magazine itself took on a much more professional look and feel with the same layout also still in use.  While the MLM and Marcus Pan partnership may have dissolved, it did bring plenty of good things to the table that the magazine continues to use and build on.

Legends 150th Issue Party
Legends Magazine held a party surrounding their 150th issue release on June 25, 2005 at Club Rare in New York City's Manhattan district.  The party featured live music by Bitter Grace, Bunker Soldier, State of Being, Amber Spyglass and Christopher Eissing, all bands except Bitter Grace having come from different states.  It also featured DJ CSB running the turntables in between music and handling the stage.

Ticket sales for the event were dismally low and the magazine nearly folded after having to cover the bar guarantee that was agreed to with the club.  While the party went well, it was under-attended causing havoc in the Legends Magazine ranks.  The party itself was featured on Manhattan television on a show called the Vampyre Lounge and the publicity was done well, but few came out to see the results.  Following the party Legends foundered for a few months before finally returning with the 151st issue months later in September, 2005.

The party, however, resulted in the splitting of Mean Little Man Productions and editor Marcus Pan's partnership as a falling out occurred during the course of the evening.

Continuing On
While the dissolving of the most prominent partnership in Legends Magazine's history was a heavy blow to the periodical at the time, Legends Magazine stumbled on now back under the sole direction of editor Marcus Pan.  The arrival of Legends #151 proved its continuation in September, 2005 while two months was spent in hiatus to recover from the dissolving.  Writers such as JHR, Sue Simpson, Jeff Franzmann, ACyD Burn and Kim Mercil, among others, continue to provide content to the issue and while expenses for the magazine were scaled back as much as possible (bands and labels receiving tear sheets of their reviews rather than a full copy of the issue) for the time being it continues to print.

Currently Legends Online, the web version and companion site to the hardcopy edition, continues strongly receiving as many as 20,000 hits a day and as many as 50,000 readers per month.  The full text and electronic versions of all issues are still available and once again become available immediately (during the Mean Little Man partnership online versions were delayed a month for marketing reasons).  October, 2005 marks Legends Magazine's 15th anniversary.

External links
 
 
 Newspaper Article about 150th Issue

Literary magazines published in the United States
Music magazines published in the United States
Magazines established in 1990